Mirza Ghulam Hafiz (2 January 192020 December 2000) was a Bangladeshi statesman, politician, and philanthropist.

Early life and education

Hafiz was born to Mirza Azimuddin Sarkar on 2 January 1920 in Panchagarh District, East Bengal, British Raj. He obtained master's degree in economics in 1941 from University of Calcutta and a bachelor's of law degree in 1948 from the University of Dhaka.

Career
Hafiz was an active organizer of the Language Movement on two separate occasions—in 1952 and again in 1954—and was jailed both times. In 1954, he was elected to the provincial assembly in Bengal as a representative of the Panchagarh district as a candidate of the United Front. He provide legal support to the defence team in the Agartala Conspiracy Case.

Mirza Hafiz was one of the founding members of the 33 member Committee for Civil Liberties and Legal Aid, which was established in March 1974 to protect the opposition politicians and members of civil society who were facing government persecution.

In 1979, Hafiz was elected to the new parliament of Bangladesh and was appointed the Minister of Land Management. From 1978 to 1982, he served as the Speaker of the Jatiya Sangsad until the coup that assassinated the President, Ziaur Rahman. After the demolition of the autocratic government of Hossain Mohammad Ershad, he was reelected to the parliament in 1991. Under the BNP, he was appointed the Minister of Law and Justice. He retired from politics in 1995.

Death 
Hafiz died on 20 December 2000.

References

1920 births
2000 deaths
People from Panchagarh District
Speakers of the Jatiya Sangsad
Bangladeshi philanthropists
Bangladesh Nationalist Party politicians
University of Calcutta alumni
University of Dhaka alumni
Land ministers of Bangladesh
Law, Justice and Parliamentary Affairs ministers of Bangladesh
20th-century philanthropists
5th Jatiya Sangsad members
Pakistani activists